The Indira Gandhi Planetarium, also known as the Patna Planetarium, is located in Patna's Indira Gandhi Science Complex. It was conceptualised in 1989 by Bihar Chief Minister Shri Satyendra Narain Sinha with construction commencing in the same year, and opened for the public from 1 April 1993. It is named after senior Indian National Congress leader and former Prime Minister of India Indira Gandhi.

The Indira Gandhi Planetarium is one of the largest planetariums in Asia. It attracts many domestic as well as foreign tourists. The planetarium has regular film shows on subjects related to astronomy. It also holds exhibitions, which attract many visitors.

The planetarium uses traditional opto-mechanical projection of celluloid film.

Criticism
In contrast to more modern digital projectors, the opto-mechanical system uses films that are difficult to change. As a consequence, the same film may be shown for years.

Competition
The first digital planetarium of Bihar was planned to open in late 2016 at the premises of Shrikrishna Science Centre near Gandhi Maidan in Patna.

See also
 Dr. A. P. J. Abdul Kalam Science City
 Bihar Museum
 Patna Museum
 Swami Vivekananda Planetarium, Mangalore

References

External links
WPD

Tourist attractions in Patna
Buildings and structures in Patna
Planetaria in India
Museums in Patna
Monuments and memorials to Indira Gandhi
1993 establishments in Bihar
Museums established in 1993